Pepe Jaramillo (born José Jaramillo García; October 27, 1921, Lerdo - April 30, 2001, Andalucia) was a notable Mexican pianist, composer, arranger, and recording artist. He was most active in London as an EMI recording artist in the 1960s and 1970s. Born in Lerdo, Durango, he began his professional music career playing in night clubs in México City. Relocating to London in the late 1950s, his many recordings and worldwide concert appearances brought him international fame. He died in his sleep of anemia at his villa in Spain. (On the internet, his activity has often been confused with the Ecuadorean singer of the same name.)

Biography

Early life and career in Mexico

Both of Pepe's parents were originally from the state of Chihuahua, but they moved to Lerdo, Durango in 1908. Pepe's father was Vicente Baca Jaramillo, and his mother was Doña Enriqueta García. Pepe had a sister and three brothers. His sister's piano playing inspired the four-year-old Pepe to teach himself to play the piano by ear. His family arranged for private lessons with a local teacher, and Pepe later continued his private lessons with a Director of the Méxican Conservatory of Music. In spite of his musical gifts, his family urged him to prepare for a success in a more stable profession. After studying dentistry for a frustrating two years, Pepe completed his higher education at the Milton Business Academy in México City, and he also devoted himself to learning English, French, Portuguese and Italian. Pepe then worked for several years for a British mining company in the state of Chihuahua. While visiting the bar at the fashionable Ritz hotel in México City, Pepe played their piano for the amusement of his friends and, consequently, was offered a job performing in the hotel's night club. This was the beginning of Pepe's lifelong career as a musician who specialized in Latin American rhythms (rumba, bolero, cha cha, samba, etc.)  

After a successful three-year stint at the Ritz, Pepe was next employed by friends who had built the "Quid Grill" restaurant and bar. Hollywood friends of the owners were successful in introducing Pepe to radio and television in México City, and he also became highly in demand as an accompanist for visiting singers. "(He has worked with a great many of the most famous Latin-American and Spanish artists.)"

As the result of a 1957 visit to Paris with his cousin (who was employed at the Méxican embassy), Pepe Jaramillo fell in love with Europe, decided to settle there, and soon moved to London. He appeared on a radio series with the BBC called "Stairway to the Stars." After hearing an appeal on TV for new artists, Pepe sent a sample of some of his Méxican releases to Norman Newell. Shortly thereafter his 20-year history (1959–1979) as an EMI recording artist was launched.

International fame and concert appearances
 
As a seasoned professional performer in Mexico, at age 38 Pepe Jaramillo was well prepared to move to the international stage. Through his  nightclub and theater performances in some of the world's major cities,  he became known as the "Ambassador of México." His performance venues in the Americas included Los Angeles, Harlem, New York City, Miami, Colombia, and Buenos Aires (at Teatro Colón). European performances included (of course) London, Paris (at the Louvre), Madrid at (Plaza Mayor), Germany, the Netherlands, Denmark, and Yugoslavia. During a world tour he performed in many theaters across Japan, (recording several releases there), and also performed in Tangier, Hong Kong (at the Mandarin Hotel), Thailand, and China. During his concert tour in Australia and New Zealand, he also performed with The Seekers. By popular demand, Pepe visited Durban (the Hotel Edward) and Johannesburg (the Dawson Hotel) for three tours of South Africa.

In London, Pepe gave a private performance for the family of the Duchess of Kent. "Also during a visit to London of [the] former President of México, Luis Echeverría, [Pepe was] invited to play at the reception hosted by Her Majesty Queen Elizabeth and the Royal Family.."

Pepe Jaramillo rose to musical prominence during the mid 20th-Century's worldwide interest in Ballroom and Latin American dancing. In 1966, music critic Nigel Hunter explained Pepe Paramillo's appeal thusly: "A large part of Pepe's popularity and achievement undoubtedly lies in the utterly unpretentious simplicity of his style...[His approach] has been vindicated again and again by the impressive sales of his records, and the triumphs of his appearances...Being Mexican, Pepe has the Latin touch innately." Not to be overlooked is the fact that Pepe Jaramillo expanded his repertoire from traditional Latin American songs to one which included Broadway show tunes, music from movie soundtracks, and other popular songs of the day (all arranged to reflect authentic Latin American rhythms). In regard to the popularity of Pepe's authentic dance rhythms among dancers, "Peggy Spencer, the well known British dance teacher and formation team coach, [said] 'You haven't lived if you haven't danced to Pepe Jaramillo.'"

Personal life and recognition

When he was not working or staying in London, Pepe Jaramillo spent his free time at his villa  Las higueras (The Fig Trees) on the Costa del Sol in Spain. He enjoyed swimming, tennis, and painting. Pepe's generous charitable benefits and sponsorships included organizations in his homeland like the Red Cross and the Church of the Sacred Heart of Jesus.

José Jaramillo García was recognized in September 1991 by Lerdo as "Distinguished Citizen." In November 1996, Pepe made another return visit to his hometown, gave several concerts, and donated a piano to the local Casa de la Cultura.

Death

On April 30, 2001, Pepe Jaramillo died of anemia during sleep at his residence located near the town of Mijas, Malaga province in (Andalusia) Spain. His ashes were returned to his family in Mexico.

Discography
Pepe Jaramillo's biographer, José Jesús Vargas Garza, states that Pepe Jaramillo recorded more than 30 LPs, mostly in the UK, but several in Japan, Colombia, and one [new release] in Mexico for Columbia Records...and that the EMI family of labels distributed his music worldwide. The following discography attempts to be complete and includes his LPs, 45rpm Singles and EPs, and the newer CD releases that feed the continued demand for his music. The first LP section lists seven known albums recorded and released in México by Columbia Records at unknown dates, but certainly previous to 1957. The next LP section chronicles Pepe Jaramillo's history with the EMI family of labels. Pepe Jaramillo is the primary artist with three exceptions, which are noted.

Because all of his recordings "contain only authentic Latin rhythms, they became popular for both listening and dancing," and he frequently recorded under variations of the name "Pepe Jaramillo & His Latin American Rhythms." Geoff Love was long associated with Pepe, and was the most frequent director of the musical accompaniment for Pepe's piano artistry. Geoff Love also arranged many of Pepe's recorded songs. There was a long association with Norman Newell, as the producer for Pepe Jaramillo's releases. With a few exceptions (in Japan and possibly Australia), all of Pepe's releases were recorded in the UK. Pepe Jaramillo composed a number of the songs he recorded on his many releases.

Studio albums (LP) México
 195? – Pepe Jaramillo y su Piano, Discos Columbia de México, DCL-90, México
 195? – Música de Gonzalo Curiel, Vol. 2, Discos Columbia de México, DCL-114, México
 195? – Pepe Jaramillo su piano y ritmos, Harmony, HL-8002, México
 195? – The danzante (The dancer), Discos Columbia de México, HL-8129, México
 195? – Pepe Jaramillo su piano y ritmos, Harmony, HL-(unreadable number), México
 195? – A bilar con sabor latino (A Dance with a Latin Flavor), CBS, México (no release number available)

Studio albums (LP) EMI
With a few exceptions, Pepe Jaramillo recorded in the UK with EMI's Parlophone label from 1959–1965. EMI then featured its Columbia Label with the "Studio 2 Stereo" series from 1966–1972. From 1973–1979 Pepe's releases used the EMI label, still featuring the "Studio 2 Stereo" series. Releases in several countries featured the EMI Odeon label. Eighteen of Pepe Jaramillo's LPs were also released in Australia. In addition to the two Japanese LP recordings listed below, three of his UK releases were also published in Japan. At least nine compilation albums (two CDs) have been published in Japan.

 1959 – Mexico Tropicale, Parlophone, PMC-1080, UK / Parlophone, PMEO-9434, Australia
 1959 – Mexico Tropical, Musart D-610, México / and Odeon T-100203, Colombia. (Note: Same tracks as above release, but name changes for Spanish LP & EP releases)
 1959 – Mexican Magic, Parlophone, PMC-1100, UK / as  Parlophone, PMEO-6002, New Zealand / and as (undated) Parlophone, PMC0-7524 (mono), Australia
 1960 – Mexican Fiesta, Parlophone, PMC-1126 (mono) & PCS-3008 (stereo), UK / on SPMEO-9687, Australia / as Fiesta Mexicana, Odeon T-102229, Colombia / and on King Records, USA (Re-issued in 1973, see below)
 1960 – South of the Border, Music for Pleasure, MFP-5242, UK  & Netherlands / and Axis Records, Axis-6073, Australia Also, remastered and issued as CD in 2014 (see CD section below).
 1961 – Salud Mexico, Parlophone, PMC-1147 (mono) & PCS-3017 (st.), UK / both mono and stereo versions by Parlophone, Australia / and by Odeon T-100310, Colombia
 1962 – Mexican on Broadway, Parlophone, PMC-1183 (mono) & PCS-3033 (st.), UK / in both versions by Parlophone, Australia / and in 1971 as Un Mexicano en Broadway, EMI-Odeon, Spain
 1963 – Mexican Pizza, Parlophone, PMC-1203 (mono) & PCS-3043 (st.), UK / in both versions by Parlophone, Australia / and by Odeon T-100331, Colombia
 1964 – The Latin World of Pepe Jaramillo, Parlophone, PMC-1231, UK / also as Parlophone, PMC-1231, Australia / and 1n 1965 by Capitol Records, T-6110 (mono), & ST-6110 (stereo), Canada
 1965 – Pepe at the Movies, Parlophone, PMC-1245 (mono) & PCS-3065 (st.), UK / and in both versions by Parlophone, Australia
 1965 – The Mexican Way, Parlophone, PMC-1253 (mono) & PCS-3069, UK / and in both versions by Parlophone, Australia
 1966 – Pepe on the Continent, Columbia, Studio 2 Stereo TWO-122, & SX-6036 (mono), UK / World Record Club SLZ-8103, New Zealand
 1966 – Carnival in Mexico, Columbia, Studio 2 Stereo TWO-147, & SX-6111 (mono), UK / Columbia SMC-74230, Germany
 1967 – Moonlight in Mexico, Columbia, Studio 2 Stereo TWO-182, & SX-6188 (mono), UK / by Columbia, 7826 (mono) in Australia. The Australian stereo version album was issued with a different front cover as The Sweetest Sounds, Columbia, Stereo SOEX-9082, LP, Australia Moonlight in Mexico was issued in 1982 by Odeon OP-8277, Japan.
 1968 – Mexicana Holiday, Columbia, Studio 2 Stereo TWO-206, UK / as EMI-7880 in Australia / and by Tai Shen KT-3086, Taiwan
 1969 – Mexican Champagne, Columbia, Studio 2 Stereo TWO-255, UK
 1969 – Latin Piano in Japan, Columbia, Studio 2 Stereo TWO-291,: also released in NZ under same number; also released in Japan by Odeon OP-8679
 1970 – Claude Ciari, Guitar & Pepe Jaramillo, Piano – Deluxe in Guitar & Piano, Odeon OKB-001, Released in Japan by Toshiba. (2 Obi releases: No. 1 in Deluxe Mood Series, & with Expo 70 Obi)
 1970 – Piano Latin Rhythm, Odeon, KJ-7006, LP, Japan
 1970 – Till There Was You, Columbia, Studio 2 Stereo TWO-307, UK / Columbia, Studio 2 Stereo TWO-397, New Zealand / & Columbia, C 062-04487, LP, Italy.
 ???? – A Mexican in the Golden City, Parlophone, PMCO-7523 (mono) & PCSO-7523, Australia. Listed as "Australian LP Series" in reference.) Also released in South Africa.
 1971 – Tequila Cocktail, Columbia, Studio 2 Stereo TWO-339, UK / Telemark Dance Records S-6399, USA
 1971 – Pepe Jaramillo / Manuel & His Music of the Mountains, Manuel Meets Pape Jaramillo / Pepe Jaramillo Meets Manuel, Columbia, Studio 2 Stereo TWO-359, / and by Columbia, Studio 2 Quadrophonic Q4 TWO-359, / and by EMI Starline, UK
 1973 – Mexican Mirage, EMI, Studio 2 Stereo TWO-411, UK
 1973 – Mexican Fiesta, Parlophone, SPMEO-10142 (st.), Australia (Re-issue of 1960 release, see above.)
 1973 – Mexican Voodoo, EMI, Studio 2 Stereo TWOX-1011, UK / and EMI EMS-80080, Japan
 1974 – Pepe and the Tijuana Sound, EMI, Studio 2 Stereo TWOX-1012, UK
 1974 – Mexican Tijuana, EMI, Studio 2 Stereo TWOX-1031, UK / and in 1975 in Spain
 1975 – Mexican Gold, EMI, Studio 2 Stereo TWOX-1047, UK / and EMI Music Malaysia, Malaysia
 1977 – Down Mexico Way, EMI, Studio 2 Stereo TWOX-1067, UK / and Embassy Records Studio 2 Stereo TWOX-1067, Israel
 1979 – Just For You, EMI One Up OU-2224, UK

Compilation albums (LP)
Nine albums of Pepe Jaramillo's songs have been released on LP in Japan. No release dates are available... possibly due to translation problems.

 196? – Sudamericana, Odeon 0-83265, LP, Germany
 196? – Mexicana, Odeon 0-83312, LP, Germany
 1965 – The Romantic World of Pepe Jaramillo, Capitol Records T-6136 (mono), ST-6136 (stereo), Canada
 1966 – Panamericana, Odeon 0-83406, LP, Germany
 1970 – The Music of Mexico, Columbia 3C 062-04298, LP, Italy.
 1970 – Latin Piano, Odeon EOP-97005, Japan.
 1970 – Pepe Jaramillo, su piano y ritmos, CBS, YS-464-C, Stereo LP, Japan
 1973 – This Is Pepe Jaramillo, EMI, Studio 2 Stereo EMSS-3, LP Sampler, UK / and EMI, Studio 2 Stereo, SPMEO-10142, Australia
 1977 – Carioca, EMI Italiana, 3C 062-07041, LP, Italy
 1982 – Romantic Rhythms, Music for Pleasure, MFP-55016, 2xLP, UK
 1986 – An Evening With Pepe Jaramillo, EMI, EMS-1091, 2xLP, UK / Also published in 1988 by budget label Music for Pleasure, DL-1090.
 n.d. – Best 20, EMI, EMS-90038, LP, Japan
 n.d. – Latin Deluxe, Odeon, OP-8010, LP, Japan
 n.d. – Latin Fiesta, Angel Records, ASP-1002, LP, Japan
 n.d. – Magic Latin, Angel Records, HV-1049, LP, Japan
 n.d. – The Breeze and I, Odeon, OW-6064, LP, Japan
 n.d. – The Latin World of Pepe Jaramillo, Odeon, OP-7229, LP, Japan (A compilation: Not the same tracks as 1964 release)
 n.d. – Pepe Jaramillo, EMI, EMS-65031-32, 2xLP, Japan

Compilation albums (CD)
Although several CDs were released during Pepe's lifetime, all of the albums in this section are composed of previously recorded tracks. One 2011 release is digital version of 1959 EP.

 1988 – Best Now, EMI, CP32-9038, CD, Japan
 1997 – Shoji Yokoughi, Pepe Jaramillo, & Claude Ciari – Mr Guitar & Friends, by WRD Music, WRCD-5019, UK (CD)
 1999 – Mexican Tijuana / Mexican Gold, EMI Digital/Parlaphone, CD #0724349613557, UK
 2001 – Pepe Jaramillo, EMI, The CD Club #0467900101S, Japan
 2006 – Moonlight in Mexico / Pepe Meets Manuel, EMI Vocation, CD #4036, UK
 2011 – Cafe Bolero, Vintage Music No. 286, CD
 2011 – Latin American Rhythm, Vintage Music, CD (misspelled "Rithm" in ads)
 2011 – Majia Mexicana, Vintage Music No.146, CD
 2011 – Mexico Tropical, Vintage Music No.141, CD (from EP)
 2012 – Salud Pepe, Jasmine Music, CD #604988019322 
 2012 – Holidays  in Italy, Vintage Music, CD (same track listing as Mexican Pizza)
 2014 – The Latin Piano, Vintage Music, CD
 2014 – Al sur de la frontera, Fonotron-Efen Records, CD EFE-1330, Spain (Not a compilation. Re-mastered and re-released edition of 1960 LP, South of the Border.)
 2014 – Latin World: Piano & Coffee, Vintage Music, CD

Singles (45rpm)

 1960 – "Fruit Salad" / "Ring Ding" – Parlophone R-4666, UK
 1962 – "Maria" / "The Surrey With the Fringe on Top" – Parlophone R-4965, UK
 1962 – "Adios" / "Sway" – Odeon 0-22-125, Germany
 1964 – "The Little Sparrow of Paris" / "The Love of My Life" – Parlophone R-5196, UK / and Parlophone R-5196, India
 1968 – "Mexico, Mexico, Mexico" / "Mexican Champagne" – Columbia DB-8467, UK
 ???? – "Hernando's Hideaway" / "Hey There" – Odeon 006-04183, France

Extended Play (EP)
The first release listed here was noted by  Pepe Jaramillo's biographer as his "very first" recording. Certainly Mexico, prior to 1957, and possibly Disco Columbia de México.

 195? – "Calla Tristeza" / "Incertidumbre" / "Dime" / "Sueño" – Unknown Label, México
 1959 – Mexico Tropical, Odeon DSOE-16.305, Spain (from 1959 LP)
 1960 – Majia Mexicana, Odeon DSOE 16.346, Spain
 1962 – Mexico Tropicale, Parlophone EPEG-1001, India (from 1959 LP)
 1962 – Latin American Cha Cha Cha, Parlophone GEP-8867, UK
 1963 – Latin American Cha Cha Cha, Parlophone GEPO-8867, Australia
 1963 – Latin American Rhythms, Parlophone GEP-8881, UK
 1964 – Latin American Rhythms, Parlophone GEPO-8881, Australia
 1964 – Pepe in Italy, Parlophone GEP-8919, UK / and Parlophone GEPO-8919, Australia
 1964 – Latin American Beguines, Parlophone GEP-8896, UK / and Parlophone GEPO-8896, Australia
 1965 – The Latin World of Pepe Jaramillo, Parlophone GEP-8944, UK / and Parlophone GEPO-8944, Australia
 1965 – The Mexican Way, Parlophone, UK
 1968 – Mexican Pizza, Odeon OP-4001, Japan
 1983 – Rumbas / Cha Cha Chas, International Dance Teachers Association IDTA-59, UK
 1983 – Sambas / Rumbas, International Dance Teachers Association IDTA-60, UK
 1983 – Cha Cha Chas, International Dance Teachers Association IDTA-61, UK
 1983 – Rumbas / Cha Cha Chas, International Dance Teachers Association IDTA-62, UK

See also

List of EMI artists

References

External links
 WorldCat Holdings for Pepe Jaramillo
 Discogs – Pepe Jaramillo
 Allmusic.com – Pepe Jaramillo
 CDandLp – Pepe Jaramillo
 Stereo2 blog – Pepe Jaramillo
 MusicBrainz – Pepe Jaramillo

 

1921 births
2001 deaths
Mexican pianists
Mexican composers
20th-century Mexican musicians
20th-century pianists
Mexican emigrants to the United Kingdom
Mexican expatriates in Spain